The Curtiss YA-10 Shrike (Model 59B) was a 1930s United States test and development version of the A-8 Shrike ground-attack aircraft using various radial engines in place of the inline Vee.

Development
The Curtiss YA-10 Shrike was the first YA-8 fitted with a Pratt & Whitney R-1690-9 (R-1690D) Hornet radial engine. The conversion was carried out in September 1932, and it was found that the aircraft's performance was not degraded by the change of engine, and low-level maneuverability was improved due to the lower mass moment of inertia with the short radial engine. The USAAC preferred radials to inline engines for the ground attack role, due to the vulnerability of the latter's cooling system to anti-aircraft fire. The US Navy also preferred radials for carrier-borne operations. Upon completion of testing the Army changed an order for 46 A-8B aircraft to the production version of the YA-10, the A-12 Shrike.

Operational history
Following completion of testing, the YA-10 was assigned to the 3rd Attack Group for operational service, then in 1934 it was assigned to the Command and General Staff School. The YA-10 was scrapped in early 1939.

The XS2C-1 was the Navy's first two-seat warplane. Since it was not equipped for carrier operations, it remained a prototype.

Variants
YA-10 Model 59B, one U.S. Army Air Corps prototype
XS2C-1 Model 69, one U.S. Navy prototype with a 625 hp (466 kW) Wright R-1510-28 Whirlwind engine, delivered December 1932

Operators

United States Army Air Corps

Specifications (YA-10)

See also

References

A-10 Shrike
A-10 Shrike
Single-engined tractor aircraft
Low-wing aircraft
Aircraft first flown in 1932